Two ships of the French Navy have borne the name La Fayette, in honour of Gilbert du Motier, marquis de La Fayette:
 The aircraft carrier , ex-USS Langley.
  (F710) – a French stealth frigate, lead ship of her class

French Navy ship names